The Central Bank of Costa Rica is the central bank of Costa Rica.

Scope
In pursuit of its mission, and to maintain the economy’s internal and external balance, the goals and operating objectives of the Central Bank of Costa Rica are as follows:

 Maintain internal stability of the national currency, seeking to turn the full employment of productive resources. 
 Maintain external stability of the national currency and ensure their free conversion to other currencies. 
 Promote a stable system of financial intermediation, efficient and competitive.

Similar to other Central Banks in the world, the functions of Central Bank of Costa Rica include providing banking services to the Government of Costa Rica and financial institutions, issuing the domestic currency, regulating commercial banks and other financial institutions, providing economic advice to the Government, conducting research and publishing information on monetary and other economic developments. Only notes and coins issued by the Central Bank shall be legal tender in Costa Rica.

Presidents
Juan Dent Alvarado, January 1950 - December 1951
Jaime Solera Bennett, January 1952 - May 1960
Ángel Coronas Guardía, June 1960 - December 1960
Max Gurdián Rojas, January 1961 - November 1962
Carlos Manuel Escalante Durán, November 1962 - December 1964
Rodolfo Lara Iraeta January 1965 - December 1967
Jaime Solera Bennett, January 1968 - December 1969
Juan Rafael Arias, January 1970 - November 1970
Jorge Rossi Chavarría, November 1970 - May 1971
Hernán Garrón Salazar, June 1971 - January 1972
Claudio Alpízar Vargas, January 1972 - December 1972
Bernal Jiménez Monge, January 1973 - September 1973
Claudio Alpízar Vargas, January 1974 - September 1974
Bernal Jiménez Monge, September 1974 - July 1977
Porfirio Morera Batres, August 1977 - November 1977
Juan José Arrea Escalante, December 1977 - May 1978
Guillermo González Truque, May 1978 - January 1980
Manuel Naranjo Coto, January 1980 - May 1982
Carlos Manuel Castillo Morales, May 1982 - April 1984
Marco Antonio López Agüero, April 1984 - September 1984
Eduardo Lizano, September 1984 - May 1990
Jorge Guardia Quirós, May 1990 - October 1993
Jorge Corrales Quesada, October 1993 - May 1994
Carlos Manuel Castillo Morales, May 1994 - March 1995
Rodrigo Bolaños Zamora, March 1995 - May 1998
Eduardo Lizano, May 1998 - November 2002
Francisco de Paula Gutiérrez Gutiérrez, November 2002 - May 2010
Rodrigo Bolaños Zamora, May 2010 - May 2014
Olivier Castro Pérez, May 2014 - Jul 2018
Rodrigo Cubero Brealey, Aug 2018 - May 2022
Róger Madrigal López, May 2022 - Present
Source:

See also
 Ministry of Finance (Costa Rica)
 BICSA
 Costa Rican colón
 Pre-Columbian Gold Museum
 Economy of Costa Rica

References

External links
  Official site of Banco Central de Costa Rica

Costa Rica
Banks of Costa Rica
1950 establishments in Costa Rica
Banks established in 1950